Melusine is a figure of European legends and folklore. 

Melusine or Melusina may also refer to:

373 Melusina, a main-belt asteroid
Melusina, Countess of Walsingham (1693-1778)
Melusine (company), an animation company based in Luxembourg
Mélusine (comics), a Belgian comic book series first published by Dupuis in 1995
Mélusine (novel), a fantasy novel by Sarah Monette
Melusine (Reimann), a 1971 opera
Mélusine, a French magazine founded by Henri Gaidoz and E. Rolland
 "Mélusine", a 2005 song by Nolwenn Leroy from Histoires Naturelles